Kin Kletso is a Chacoan Ancestral Pueblo great house and notable archaeological site located in Chaco Culture National Historical Park,  southwest of Nageezi, New Mexico, United States. From its masonry work, rectangular shape and design Kletso is identified as Pueblo III architecture by prominent Chaco archaeologists Stephen H. Lekson and Tom Windes. They also argue that this great house was only occupied by one or two households. Fagen writes that Kletso contained around 55 rooms, four ground-floor kivas, and a two-story cylindrical tower that may have functioned as a kiva or religious center. Evidence of an obsidian production industry were discovered here. The house was erected between 1125 and 1130.

Etymology 

Notes

External links 
 Kin Kletso, a photo gallery

References 
 .

Colorado Plateau
Chaco Canyon
Former populated places in New Mexico
Chaco Culture National Historical Park
Ancestral Puebloans